George Bradley (1852–1931) was an American baseball player.

George Bradley may also refer to:
 Foghorn Bradley (George H. Bradley, 1855–1900), American baseball umpire
 George Bradley (cricketer) (1850–1887), English cricketer
 George Bradley (journalist) (1816–1863), English journalist
 George Bradley (Medal of Honor) (1881–1942), U.S. Navy officer
 George Bradley (Minnesota politician) (1833–1879), Minnesota politician
 George Bradley (outfielder) (1914–1982), American baseball player
 George Bradley (poet) (born 1953), American poet
 George Granville Bradley (1821–1903), Dean of Westminster, scholar, and schoolteacher
 George Bradley (rugby league), New Zealand rugby league footballer
 George B. Bradley (1825–1916), New York politician and Supreme Court justice

See also
 USS George H. Bradley (SP-327), a United States Navy patrol vessel and minesweeper
 Brad Hogg (George Bradley Hogg, born 1971), Australian cricketer